Centralne Warsztaty Lotnicze (Central Aviation Workshops, CWL) was the Polish state-owned aircraft repair works and manufacturer in Warsaw, active between 1918 and 1928. The workshops were created on 20 November 1918, just after Poland had regained independence after World War I and Warsaw was liberated from German occupation. They were located in Warsaw at the fringe of the airport in Mokotów at 2a Puławska Street. Initially its main task were repairs of engines and aircraft. It also produced aircraft under French licence in the 1920s:

Hanriot HD.14 (as H-28, 125 built in 1925-1926).
SPAD 61
 
Some aircraft were designed by engineers working for CWL, but none entered production.

Selected aircraft designed in CWL:

CWL WZ.X
D1 Cykacz
ST-3

In early 1920s, CWL was renamed Warsztaty Centralnych Zakładów Lotniczych (Workshops of the Central Aviation Works). In 1928 CWL transformed into PZL (State Aviation Works), soon to become the biggest Polish aircraft manufacturer.

References

Andrzej Glass (1977): "Polskie konstrukcje lotnicze 1893-1939" (Polish aviation constructions 1893-1939), WKiŁ, Warsaw 

Aircraft manufacturers of Poland
Manufacturing companies based in Warsaw
Mokotów